Comamonas terrigena is a Gram-negative, rod-shaped bacterium from the genus  Comamonas and the family of Comamonadaceae, which was isolated from contaminated soil in Slovakia. C. terrigena has the ability to degrade phenols.

References

External links
Type strain of Comamonas terrigena at BacDive -  the Bacterial Diversity Metadatabase

Comamonadaceae
Bacteria described in 1985